Hans Kilian (alternate listings: Hanns Kilian, Hans Killian, or Hanns Killian (2 May 1905 – 17 April 1981) was a German bobsledder who competed from the late 1920s to the late 1930s. Competing in three Winter Olympics, he won two bronze medals (1928: Five-man, 1932: Four-man).

Kilian also won seven medals at the FIBT World Championships, including three golds (Two-man: 1931, Four-man: 1934, 1935), one silver (Four-man: 1938), and two bronzes (Two-man and four-man: both 1939).

He was born and died in Garmisch-Partenkirchen.

References

 Bobsleigh four-man Olympic medalists for 1924, 1932-56, and since 1964
 Bobsleigh five-man Olympic medalists for 1928
 Bobsleigh two-man world championship medalists since 1931
 Bobsleigh four-man world championship medalists since 1930
 
 Wallenchinsky, David. (1984). "Bobsled". In The Complete Book the Olympics: 1896-1980. New York: Penguin Books. pp. 558–60.

External links
 
 

1905 births
1981 deaths
German male bobsledders
Bobsledders at the 1928 Winter Olympics
Bobsledders at the 1932 Winter Olympics
Bobsledders at the 1936 Winter Olympics
Olympic bobsledders of Germany
Olympic bronze medalists for Germany
Olympic medalists in bobsleigh
Sportspeople from Garmisch-Partenkirchen
Medalists at the 1928 Winter Olympics
Medalists at the 1932 Winter Olympics
Officers Crosses of the Order of Merit of the Federal Republic of Germany